Rudolf von Buol-Berenberg (born 24 May 1842 in Zizenhausen near Stockach; died 4 July 1902 in Baden-Baden) was a German judge and politician for Centre Party.

Life 
He went to school at gymnasiums in Konstanz. He studied German law at universities in Munich, in Freiburg  and in Heidelberg.Sine 1870 he worked as judge in Mannheim. From 1881 to 1897 amd from 1891 to 1894  Buol-Berenberg was member of the Second Chamber of the Diet of the Grand Duchy of Baden. From 1884 to 1898 Buol-Berenberg was member of Reichstag. From 1895 to 1898 Buol-Berenberg was president of Reichstag. He was president of Katholikentag in Koblenz. He was married with Elisabeth von Savigny (1856-1902) and had one daughter.

References

External links

Literature over Buol-Berenberg 
 Wolfgang Kramer: "Ritter ohne Furcht und Tadel" - Reichstagspräsident Rudolf von Buol-Berenberg. In: Mühlingen, eine gemeinsame Ortsgeschichte der Madachdörfer Gallmannsweil, Mainwangen. Mühlingen, Schwackenreute und Zoznegg (= Hegau-Bibliothek. Band 135). MarkOrPlan Hegau-Bodensee. Singen (Hohentwiel) 2007. ISBN 978-3-933356-48-2, p. 386 f.

Barons of Germany
German Roman Catholics
Centre Party (Germany) politicians
19th-century German politicians
Members of the 6th Reichstag of the German Empire
Members of the 7th Reichstag of the German Empire
Members of the 8th Reichstag of the German Empire
Members of the 9th Reichstag of the German Empire
Members of the Reichstag of the German Empire
Members of the Second Chamber of the Diet of the Grand Duchy of Baden
University of Freiburg alumni
Heidelberg University alumni
People from the Grand Duchy of Baden
1842 births
1902 deaths